These are lists of Colorado Rockies records from their inception all the way through the 2018 season.

Single season records

Batting
Games: Vinny Castilla, 162 (1998), Neifi Pérez, 162 (1998), Neifi Pérez, 162 (2000)
Batting Average: Larry Walker, .379 (1999)
On-base percentage: Todd Helton, .469 (2004)
Slugging Percentage: Larry Walker, .720 (1997)
OPS: Larry Walker, 1.172 (1997)
At Bats: Neifi Pérez, 690 (1999)
Runs: Larry Walker, 143 (1997)
Hits: Dante Bichette, 219 (1998)
Total Bases: Larry Walker, 409 (1997)
Doubles: Todd Helton, 59 (2000)
Triples: Dexter Fowler, 15 (2011)
Home Runs: Larry Walker, 49 (1997), Todd Helton, 49 (2001)
RBI: Andrés Galarraga, 150 (1996)
Walks: Todd Helton, 127 (2004)
Strikeouts: Trevor Story, 191 (2017)
Stolen Bases: Willy Taveras, 68 (2008)
Singles: Juan Pierre, 163 (2001)
Runs Created: Todd Helton, 192 (2000)
Extra-Base Hits: Todd Helton, 105 (2001)
Times on Base: Todd Helton, 323 (2000)
Hit by Pitch: Eric Young, 21 (1996)
Sacrifice Hits: Royce Clayton, 24 (2004)
Sacrifice Flies: Jeff Cirillo, 12 (2000)
At Bats per Strikeout: Juan Pierre, 21.3 (2001)
At Bats per Home Run: Larry Walker, 11.6 (1997)

Pitching
Earned Run Average: Kyle Freeland, 2.85 (2018)
Won-Loss percentage: Jorge de la Rosa, .727 (2013)
WHIP: Ubaldo Jiménez, 1.12 (2010)
Hits Allowed per 9 innings pitched: Ubaldo Jiménez, 6.66 (2010)
Walks Allowed per 9 innings pitched: Aaron Cook, 2.04 (2008)
Strikeouts per 9 innings pitched: Germán Márquez, 10.5 (2018)
Games: Matt Belisle, 80 (2012)
Saves: Wade Davis, 43 (2018)
Innings: Pedro Astacio, 232 (1999)
Strikeouts: Germán Márquez, 230 (2018)
Complete Games: Pedro Astacio, 7 (1999)

Shutouts: Roger Bailey, 2 (1997), Jason Marquis, 2 (2009), Ubaldo Jiménez, 2 (2010)
Home Runs Allowed: Pedro Astacio, 39 (1998)
Walks Allowed: Darryl Kile, 109 (1999)
Hits Allowed: Pedro Astacio, 258 (1999)
Strikeout to Walk: Germán Márquez, 4.04 (2018)
Wins: Ubaldo Jiménez, 19 (2010)
Losses: Darryl Kile, 17 (1998)
Earned Runs Allowed: Pedro Astacio, 145 (1998)
Hit Batsmen: Pedro Astacio, 17 (1998)
Batters Faced: Darryl Kile, 1,020 (1998)
Games Finished: Jose Jimenez, 69 (2002)

Fielding Records
Most Putouts: Andrés Galarraga, 1528 (1996)
Most Assists: Troy Tulowitzki, 561 (2007)
Highest Fielding Average by an Infielder: Todd Helton, .999 (2001)
Highest Fielding Average by an Outfielder: Charlie Blackmon, .997 (2018)
Most Errors: Walt Weiss, 30 (1996)

Career records

Batting
Batting Average: Larry Walker, .334
On-base percentage: Larry Walker, .426
Slugging Percentage: Larry Walker, .618
OPS: Larry Walker, 1.044
Games: Todd Helton, 2,247
At Bats: Todd Helton, 7,962
Runs: Todd Helton, 1,401
Hits: Todd Helton, 2,519
Total Bases: Todd Helton, 4,292
Doubles: Todd Helton, 592
Triples: Dexter Fowler, 53
Home Runs: Todd Helton, 369
RBI: Todd Helton, 1,406
Walks: Todd Helton, 1,335
Strikeouts: Todd Helton, 1,175
Stolen Bases: Eric Young, 180
Singles: Todd Helton, 1,879
Runs Created: Todd Helton, 1,759
Extra-Base Hits: Todd Helton, 998
Total Plate Appearances: Todd Helton, 9,453
Times on Base: Todd Helton, 3,675
Hit by Pitch: Larry Walker, 98
Sacrifice Flies: Todd Helton, 93
Sacrifice Hits: Aaron Cook, 67
Intentional Walks: Todd Helton, 185
Grounded into Double Plays: Todd Helton, 186
At Bats per Strikeout: Juan Pierre, 14.7
At Bats per Home Run: Andrés Galarraga, 15.5

Pitching
Earned Run Average: Brian Fuentes, 3.38
Wins: Jorge de la Rosa, 86
Win–loss percentage: Darren Holmes, .639
WHIP: Brian Fuentes, 1.24
Hits Allowed per 9 innings pitched: Ubaldo Jiménez, 7.47
Walks Allowed per 9 innings pitched: Aaron Cook, 2.75
Strikeouts per 9 innings pitched: Ubaldo Jiménez, 8.18
Games: Steve Reed, 461
Saves: Brian Fuentes, 115
Innings: Aaron Cook, 1,312 1/3
Strikeouts: Jorge de la Rosa, 985
Games Started: Aaron Cook, 206
Complete Games: Pedro Astacio, 14
Shutouts:  Jason Jennings & Ubaldo Jiménez, 3
Home Runs Allowed: Pedro Astacio, 139
Walks Allowed: Jorge de la Rosa, 481
Hits Allowed: Aaron Cook, 1,519
Strikeout to Walk: Pedro Astacio, 2.58
Losses: Aaron Cook, 68
Earned Runs Allowed: Aaron Cook, 660
Wild Pitches: Ubaldo Jiménez, 49
Hit Batsmen: Pedro Astacio, 58
Batters Faced: Aaron Cook, 5,630
Games Finished: Brian Fuentes, 243

Rockies Team Records
Games: 163 (2007), 163 (2018)
Wins: 92 (2009)
Losses: 98 (2012)
Highest Winning Percentage: .568 (2009)
Lowest Winning Percentage: .395 (2012)

Batting Records
Batting Average: .294 (2000)
Hits: 1,664 (2000)
Runs: 968 (2000)
Singles: 1,130 (2000)
Doubles: 333 (1998)
Triples: 61 (2001)
Stolen Bases: 201 (1996)
Home Runs: 239 (1997)
Grand Slams: 5 (1994), 5 (1998), 5 (2000), 5 (2002)
Pinch-Homers: 11 (1995), 11 (2004)
RBI: 909 (1996)
Total Bases: 2,748 (2001)
Extra-Base Hits: 598 (2001)
Slugging Percent: .483 (2001)
On-Base Percent: .362 (2000)
Hit by Pitch: 82 (1996)
Left On Base: 1,198 (2000)
Walks: 660 (2009)
Intentional Bases on Balls: 64 (2000)
Most Strikeouts: 1,408 (2017)

Pitching Records
Saves: 51 (2018)
Fewest Saves 26 (2001)
Most Blown Saves 34 (2001)
Complete Games: 12 (1999)
Most Runs Allowed: 1,028 (1999)
Fewest Runs Allowed: 638 (1994) (117-game season)
Most Earned Runs Allowed: 955 (1999)
Fewest Earned Runs Allowed: 590 (1994) (117-game season)
Most Hits Allowed: 1,700 (1999)
Most Walks Allowed: 737 (1999)
Most Strikeouts: 1,387 (2018)
Most Shutouts: 12 (2010)
Lowest ERA: 4.14 (2010)
Most Wild Pitches: 82 (1993)
Most Homers Allowed: 239 (2001)
Fewest Homers Allowed: 120 (1994) (117-game season)
Most Hit Batters: 84 (2003), 84 (2005)
Most Balks: 22 (1993)
Most Pickoffs: 28 (1993)

Fielding Records
Highest Fielding Percent: .98925 (2007, MLB Record)
Most Assists: 48 (1999)
Most Errors: 167 (1993)
Fewest Errors: 67 (2007)
Most Double Plays: 202 (1997)
Most Passed Balls: 22 (1996)
Most Games Consecutive, one or more errors 9 (June 18–27, 1996)
Most Consecutive Errorless Games: 13 (June 12–24, 1998)

Records
Colorado Rockies